Katy Moran (born 1975) is an English contemporary artist whose work is in the collection of the Arts Council and the Government Art Collection. Moran is represented by Stuart Shave/Modern Art and the Andrea Rosen Gallery.

Moran's first solo exhibition was for Stuart Shave/Modern Art, in London, 2006. She has also exhibited at Andrea Rosen Gallery, Wexner Center for the Arts, and the Walker Art Center. Her latest is at the Parasol Unit, 2015.

Early life and education
Moran is from Manchester with her parents being art teachers. She graduated from Leeds Metropolitan University in 1998 with a BA Hons degree in Graphic Art. She received an MA in painting from the Royal College of Art in 2005.

Exhibitions

Solo exhibitions 

 2006: Stuart Shave/Modern Art, London; Grusenmeyer Art Gallery, Deurie, France.
 2008: Katy Moran: Paintings, Middlesbrough Institute of Modern Art, UK; Anthony Meier Fine Arts, San Francisco, California, USA; Andrea Rosen Gallery, New York City.
 2009: Contemporary Fine and Applied Arts: 1928–2009, Tate St Ives, St Ives, UK; Stuart Shave/Modern Art, London; Galleria II Capricorno, Venice, Italy.
 2010: Six Solos, Katy Moran, Wexner Center for the Arts, Columbus, Ohio, USA.
 2011: Andrea Rosen Gallery, New York City.
 2013: Stuart Shave/Modern Art, London; Douglas Hyde Gallery, Dublin, Ireland, UK.
 2015: Katy Moran, Parasol unit foundation for contemporary art, London;Andrea Rosen Gallery, New York City
 2017: Modern Art, London
 2019: I want to live in the afternoon of that day, Sperone Westwater, New York City

Group exhibitions 

 2005: Art Futures, Bloomberg Space, (Art Review magazine prize), London; Peculiar Encounters, Ec Artspace, London; New London Kicks, The Wooster Project, New York City; Morpho Eugenia, Museo di Stato, San Marino, Italy; MA Show, Royal College of Art, London; Man Drawing Prize, Royal College of Art, London.
 2006: A Broken Arm, 303 Gallery, New York City; New Contemporaries 2006, London and Liverpool, UK (touring); Young Painters, Grusenmeyer Gallery, Deurle, Belgium; Primetime Painting: Young Art from London, Galerie Seitz, Berlin, Germany; Sunset in Athens II, Vamialis Gallery, Athens, Greece.
 2007: Dining Room Show, Andrea Rosen Gallery, New York City; Old Space New Space, Gagosian Gallery, New York City; The Painting Show: Slipping Abstraction, Mead Gallery, Warwick Arts Centre, University of Warwick, Coventry, UK; Salon Nouveau, Galerie Engholm Engelhorn, Vienna, Austria.
 2008: Art Now: Strange Solution, Tate Britain, London; Selections from the Orvitz Family Collection, ASU Art Museum, Tempe, Arizona, USA.
 2009: Visible Invisible: Against the Security of the Real, Parasol unit foundation for contemporary art, London; We're Moving, Royal College of Art, London; Surface Reality, Laing Art Gallery, Newcastle, UK; Contemporary Fine Arts and Applied Arts: 1928–2009, Tate St Ives, St Ives, UK; Cave Painting, Gresham's Ghost, New York City.
 2010: Tasters' Choice, Stephen Friedman, London; Le Tableau, Cheim & Read, New York City; Feint Art, Kunstverein Freiburg, Freiburg, Germany.
 2011: Le Magasin-CNAC (Centre National d'Art Contemporain), Grenoble, France; Creating the New Century: Contemporary Art from the Dicke Collection, The Dayton Art Institute, Dayton, Ohio, USA.
 2012: The Far and the Near: Replaying Art in St Ives, Tate St Ives, St Ives, UK; Contemporary Painting, 1960 to the Present: Selections from the SFMOMA Collection, SFMOMA, San Francisco, California, USA.
 2013: A Personal Choice, by Bruna Aickelin, Galleria II Capricorno, Venice, Italy; Lloyds Club, London; Painter Painter, Walker Art Center, Minneapolis, Minnesota, USA; Inevitable Figuration, Centro per l'Arte Contemporanea Luigi Pecci, Prato, Italy.
 2014: Somos Libres II. Works from the Mario Testino Collection, Pinacoteca Gianni e Marella, Agnelli, Turin, Italy
 2015: Intimacy in Discourse: Reasonable and Unreasonable Sized Paintings, Mana Contemporary, Jersey City, New Jersey, USA; One Day, Something Happens: Paintings of People. A selection by Jennifer Higgie from The Arts Council Collection (England), Leeds Art Gallery, Leeds; Highlanes Gallery, Drogheda, Ireland; The Atkinson, Southport; Towner Art Gallery, Eastbourne; Second Chances, Aspen Art Museum, Aspen, Colorado, USA
 2016: Theories of Modern Art, Modern Art, London
2018: Summer Exhibition, Modern Art, London; Surface Work, Victoria Miro, London; Virginia Woolf: An Exhibition Inspired by Her Writings, Tate St Ives, Cornwall; travelling to Pallant House Gallery, Chichester; Fitzwilliam Museum, Cambridge

Collections 

Arts Council Collection, London
David Roberts Art Foundation, London
Government Art Collection, London 
Pinault Collection, Venice, Italy
Royal College of Art, London
Rubell Family Collection, Miami, Florida, USA
Sammlung Goetz, Munich, Germany
San Francisco Museum of Modern Art, San Francisco, California, USA
Tate, London
Walker Art Center, Minneapolis, Minnesota, USA
Zabludowicz Collection, London

References

External links
Katy Moran at Modern Art.
Katy Moran talking about her method.

Katy Moran at The Independent

1975 births
Artists from Manchester
English contemporary artists
Living people
Alumni of the Royal College of Art
Alumni of Leeds Beckett University